Treviranus is a surname. People with the surname include:

 Gottfried Reinhold Treviranus (1776–1837), German naturalist
 Gottfried Reinhold Treviranus (politician) (1891–1971), German politician
 Ludolph Christian Treviranus (1779–1864), German botanist, younger brother of Gottfried Reinhold Treviranus

Surnames of German origin